Coleophora betulella is a moth of the family Coleophoridae. It is found in all of Europe, except the Balkan peninsula.

Description
The wingspan is 10–15 mm. The moth's head is white, as are the antennae which are ringed with pale brownish. It has a basal joint with rather short tuft. The labial palps and forewings are also white. The veins are faintly yellowish-tinged, near apex more fuscous ; costal edge anteriorly finely dark fuscous, near apex more strongly; costal cilia fuscous or dark fuscous except at base and tips. Hindwings rather dark grey.  Only reliably identified by dissection and microscopic examination of the genitalia.

Adults are on wing from June to July.

The larvae feed on silver birch (Betula pendula) and downy birch (Betula pubescens). In its final stage the larva lives in a pistol shaped case, that with a mouth angle of 30°-45° is standing obliquely on the leaf.

References

External links

Swedish Moths
UKmoths

betulella
Moths described in 1876
Moths of Europe
Taxa named by Hermann von Heinemann
Taxa named by Maximilian Ferdinand Wocke